Qin Fulin (born 12 January 1994) is a Chinese weightlifter.

He participated at the 2018 World Weightlifting Championships in Ashgabat, Turkmenistan, winning the bronze medal.

References

External links

1994 births
Living people
Chinese male weightlifters
World Weightlifting Championships medalists
21st-century Chinese people